Life is an unincorporated community in Henderson County, Tennessee.

History
A post office called Life was established in 1881, and remained in operation until 1934. The origin of the name "Life" is obscure.

References

Unincorporated communities in Henderson County, Tennessee
Unincorporated communities in Tennessee